The Heald Square Monument is a bronze sculpture group by Lorado Taft in Heald Square, Chicago, Illinois. It depicts General George Washington, and the two principal financiers of the American Revolution, Robert Morris and Haym Salomon. Following Taft's 1936 death, the sculpture was completed by his associates Leonard Crunelle, Nellie Walker and Fred Torrey.

Heald Square is located in the Michigan–Wacker Historic District of Chicago's Loop community area. The square was named for Captain Nathan Heald, commander of Fort Dearborn from 1810 to 1812.

The sculpture was designated a Chicago Landmark on September 15, 1971.

See also
 List of public art in Chicago
 List of statues of George Washington
 List of sculptures of presidents of the United States

References

External links
 

1941 establishments in Illinois
1941 sculptures
Bronze sculptures in Illinois
Statues of George Washington
Chicago Landmarks
Outdoor sculptures in Chicago
Sculptures by Lorado Taft
Statues in Chicago
Sculptures of men in Illinois
Monuments and memorials to George Washington in the United States
Monuments and memorials to United States Founding Fathers